The Internet Research Task Force (IRTF) is an organization, overseen by the Internet Architecture Board, that focuses on longer-term research issues related to the Internet. A parallel organization, the Internet Engineering Task Force (IETF), focuses on the shorter term issues of engineering and standards making. 

The IRTF promotes research of importance to the evolution of the Internet by creating focused, long-term research groups working on topics related to Internet protocols, applications, architecture and technology. Unlike the IETF, the task force does not set standards and there is no explicit outcome expected of IRTF research groups.

Organization 

The IRTF is composed of a number of focused and long-term research groups. These groups work on topics related to Internet protocols, applications, architecture and technology. Research groups have the stable long-term membership needed to promote the development of research collaboration and teamwork in exploring research issues. Participation is by individual contributors, rather than by representatives of organizations. The list of current groups can be found on the IRTF's homepage.

Operations 

The IRTF is managed by the IRTF chair in consultation with the Internet Research Steering Group (IRSG). The IRSG membership includes the IRTF chair, the chairs of the various Research Groups and other individuals (members at large) from the research community selected by the IRTF chair. The chair of the IRTF is appointed by the Internet Architecture Board (IAB) for a two-year term.

These individuals have chaired the IRTF:

 David D. Clark, 1989–1992
 Jon Postel, 1992–1995
 Abel Weinrib, 1995–1999
 Erik Huizer, 1999–2001
 Vern Paxson, 2001–2005
 Aaron Falk, 2005–2011
 Lars Eggert, 2011–2017
 Allison Mankin, 2017–2019
 Colin Perkins, 2019–Present

The IRTF chair is responsible for ensuring that research groups produce coherent, coordinated, architecturally consistent and timely output as a contribution to the overall evolution of the Internet architecture. In addition to the detailed tasks related to research groups outlined below, the IRTF chair may also from time to time arrange for topical workshops attended by the IRSG and perhaps other experts in the field.

The RFC Editor publishes documents from the IRTF and its research groups on the IRTF stream. The detailed IRTF research group guidelines and procedures are described in RFC 2014. The procedures for publishing documents on the IRTF RFC stream are defined in RFC 5743. The concept of RFC streams is defined in RFC 4844.

See also
Internet studies
IRTF (disambiguation)

References

External links 
Internet Research Task Force
RFC 2014 (BCP 8) describes more fully the guidelines and procedures of the IRTF Research Groups.

Internet governance organizations
Computer network organizations
Internet Standard organizations
Internet-related organizations
Task forces